Eric John Brunner (born July 1953) is professor of social and biological epidemiology and public health at University College London.

References

External links 
https://www.researchgate.net/profile/Eric_Brunner3

Academics of University College London
Living people
Alumni of the University of Exeter
Alumni of the University of London
1953 births
British epidemiologists
Alumni of University College London